Matt Roy is an American bobsledder, born in New York City, who competed in the mid to late 1980s. He won the Bobsleigh World Cup combined men's event in 1986-7 and unofficial four-man event that same year.

Roy finished 16th in both the two-man and four-man event at the 1988 Winter Olympics in Calgary. He later became Executive Director for the United States Bobsled and Skeleton Federation in the early 1990s.

References
1988 four-man bobsleigh results
1988 two-man bobsleigh results
List of combined men's bobsleigh World Cup champions: 1985-2007
List of four-man bobsleigh World Cup champions since 1985
US Olympic Committee January 23, 2003 article on the FIBT World Championships 2003 featuring Roy. - accessed March 26, 2008.

American male bobsledders
Bobsledders at the 1988 Winter Olympics
Olympic bobsledders of the United States
Sportspeople from New York City
Living people
Year of birth missing (living people)